The 1993 Chico State Wildcats football team represented California State University, Chico as a member of the Northern California Athletic Conference (NCAC) during the 1993 NCAA Division II football season. Led by fifth-year head coach Gary Hauser, Chico State compiled an overall record of 4–4–1 with a mark of 3–0–1 in conference play, winning the NCAC title. The team was outscored by its opponents 248 to 181 for the season. The Wildcats played home games at University Stadium in Chico, California.

Schedule

References

Chico State
Chico State Wildcats football seasons
Northern California Athletic Conference football champion seasons
Chico State Wildcats football